Choi Bong-jin (born 6 April 1992) is a South Korean footballer who plays as goalkeeper for Gimpo FC in K-League 2.

Career
Choi joined K League Challenge side Gyeongnam FC in January 2016.

He was transferred to Gwangju FC in exchange for Ryu Beom-hee in July 2016.

References

External links 

1992 births
Living people
Association football goalkeepers
South Korean footballers
Gyeongnam FC players
Gwangju FC players
K League 1 players
K League 2 players
Chung-Ang University alumni